Jalan BOH (Pahang state route C162) is a major road in Cameron Highlands, Pahang, Malaysia.

List of junctions

Roads in Pahang